Naiara Egozkue Extremado (born 21 October 1983) is a Spanish handball player for CB Atlético Guardés and the Spanish national team.

She represented Spain at the 2013 World Women's Handball Championship and 2016 Olympics. In September 2015 she was selected as Player of the Month in the Division de Honor Femenina in Spain.

References

External links

1983 births
Living people
Sportspeople from Pamplona
Expatriate handball players
Spanish expatriate sportspeople in Germany
Spanish female handball players
Handball players at the 2016 Summer Olympics
Olympic handball players of Spain
Competitors at the 2013 Mediterranean Games
Mediterranean Games competitors for Spain
Handball players from Navarre
21st-century Spanish women